Norwood is a census-designated place (CDP) in Cherokee and Muskogee counties, Oklahoma, United States. It was first listed as a CDP prior to the 2020 census.

The CDP is mainly in western Cherokee County and extends to the south into the northeast corner of Muskogee County. It is bordered to the southeast by Woodall. U.S. Route 62 forms the southern edge of the CDP; it leads west  to Fort Gibson and northeast  to Tahlequah, the Cherokee county seat. Norwood Mountain is in the northern part of the CDP.

Demographics

References 

Census-designated places in Cherokee County, Oklahoma
Census-designated places in Muskogee County, Oklahoma
Census-designated places in Oklahoma